Although doctoral degrees appeared in the universities of West Europe in the 12th and 13th centuries, for a long time they were given only to men. Below is a list of the women who obtained doctoral degrees before 1800. The list includes only academic degrees, not Doctors of Divinity.

Constance Calenda may have received a medical degree from the University of Naples. Juliana Morell "defended theses" in 1606 or 1607, although claims that she received a doctorate in canon law in 1608 have been discredited. The putative 13th-century instance of Bittizia Gozzadini at the University of Bologna is discounted by Holt N. Parker.

References

Literature
  (complete list for 18th century)

Lists of women
Lists of women scientists
Women academics